Love and Hate may refer to:

 Love and hate (psychoanalysis), psychoanalytic concepts

Books
"Catullus 85", a poem by Catullus the first line thus commonly referred to as Odo at Amo which translates as hate and love 
Love and Hate, 1970 Russian novel by Ivan Shevtsov
Love and Hate: The Natural History of Behavior Patterns, a 1970 German book by Irenäus Eibl-Eibesfeld
 Love + Hate: Stories and Essays, collection of stories and essays by Hanif Kureishi 2015

Film and TV
 Love and Hate (1916 film), a lost silent film
 Love and Hate (1924 film), a silent British film directed by Thomas Bentley
Love and Hate, 1935 Russian film by Albert Gendelshtein with music by Shostakovich
Love and Hate: The Story of Colin and JoAnn Thatcher, 1989 TV film with Kenneth Welsh
 Love + Hate (2005 film), a British drama film

Music
 Love & Hate (Aceyalone album), 2003
 Love & Hate (Aventura album)
 Love & Hate (Michael Kiwanuka album), 2016
 Love & Hate (Hyolyn album), 2013
 Love & Hate (Lil Rob album), 2009
 Love and Hate (Joan Osborne album), 2014
 Love & Hate (Section 25 album), 1988
 Love & Hate, a 2004 EP by Ping Pung
Love and Hate, a 2016 EP by electronic artist Aero Chord
 "Love & Hate" (song), a 1994 song by Ryuichi Sakamoto and Holly Johnson

See also
 Ambivalence, a state of having simultaneous, conflicting reactions towards some object
 Between Love and Hate (disambiguation)
 Love Hate (disambiguation)
 Love–hate relationship, a relationship involving simultaneous or alternating emotions of love and hate